St. Joseph's Boys' School (informally Boys' School or SJBS) is a boys' school up to matriculation (tenth grade) and a co-educational school in its higher secondary level (equivalent to A Level) in Jalandhar city of Punjab, India.

Founded in 1973 with the initiative of Symphorian Thomas Keeprath, Bishop of Jalandhar, the school imparts primary, secondary  and higher secondary education. Apart from this, the school conducts Kindergarten classes. The school has 12 grades plus two Kindergarten and one nursery grade summing up to 15 grades. The tenth grade is equivalent to the final year of higher education. The curriculum is based on the instructions and rules laid down by the ICSE and HSC for the secondary and higher secondary levels respectively.

The Boys' school is affiliated to  ICSE, New Delhi. The examinations conducted are recognized by the Government of India through an act of Parliament.

The sisters of the congregation of the Sacred Heart run this school under the management of the Diocese of Jalandhar. The Diocesan Board of Education, Jalandhar supervises its education policies.

Admission and  academics
The academic year begins in April and ends in the month of March.

Students are admitted through a series of oral and written tests followed by an interview process. The minimum age requirement for nursery admissions is 3 years. No advance registration can be made until 3 months before the prospective year of admission. At the time of admission birth certificate is demanded, according to the direction of the Registrar General of India (Population) Ministry of Home Affairs, Government of India.

Infrastructure

The school has three storeyed two wings — one for primary and one for secondary level. There's a separate edifice where the classes for higher secondary levels are conducted. The school has two libraries.

The science labs are separate for the primary and higher secondary levels. The labs are equipped with latest and up-to-date apparatuses. Extreme precaution is taken while performing experiments especially involving flame tests.

Grades and levels
The number of students in each classroom range from 45 to 50. The categorization of grades under different levels is as below:

Pre school level
Nursery
Lower K.G.
Upper K.G.

Primary level
Grade 1
Grade 2
Grade 3 
Grade 4
Grade 5

Secondary level
Grade 6
Grade 7   
Grade 8 
Grade 9  
Grade 10 (final year of higher education)

Senior secondary level (A level)
Grade 11 (plus one)
Grade 12 (plus two)

Subjects offered
The school introduces subjects at different grades and levels. There's a choice between Hindi and Punjabi language in ninth grade and onwards. The subjects offered in are:

Secondary level
English grammar
English literature
Maths 
Physics
Chemistry
Biology
Environmental science
Computer education
Hindi language
Punjabi language
Physical education
History and Civics
Geography

Higher secondary level
English Grammar
English literature
Maths 
Physics
Chemistry
Biology
Environmental science
Computer education

Sports
The school conducts sports competitions at different levels and in the school houses.

Outdoor games
The common sports played here are:
Football
Basketball
Cricket
Hockey
Kho Kho
Kabaddi

Apart from these, other sports are included in competitions depending on pupil interest.

Athletics
High jump
Long jump
Sprint
Shot put

Student evaluation
In each subject, the pass percentage is 60%, which is comparatively high compared to other schools. The scores obtained by a student in the written and laboratory exams decide the ultimate aggregate percentage of a pupil. The marks of assignments and project work are included in the overall percentage.

Oral examinations are taken in lower grades but in higher grades more focus is on the lab work. The students scoring above the pass percentage are only promoted to the next grade. The active participation of the student in competitions and functions is taken into account for his/her promotion to the next grade.

References

External links
Official school website
The Boys' School, Jalandhar

Boys' schools in India
Christian schools in Punjab, India
Education in Jalandhar
Educational institutions established in 1973
1973 establishments in Punjab, India